The Ryugase Group is a geological formation on Sakhalin Island in far eastern Russia whose strata date back to the Late Cretaceous.

Vertebrate paleofauna 
 Nipponosaurus sachalinensis - "Partial skull and associated postcrania, juvenile." Probably actually from the Yezo Group.

See also 
 List of dinosaur-bearing rock formations
 List of fossiliferous stratigraphic units in Russia

References

Bibliography 
  

Geologic groups of Asia
Geologic formations of Russia
Upper Cretaceous Series of Asia
Cretaceous Russia
Campanian Stage
Santonian Stage
Mudstone formations
Shallow marine deposits
Paleontology in Russia
Geography of Sakhalin Oblast